Number 30 Squadron of the Royal Air Force operates the Airbus A400M Atlas transport aircraft and is based at RAF Brize Norton, Oxfordshire.

The squadron was first formed as a unit of the Royal Flying Corps in 1915, serving through the rest of the First World War in Egypt and Mesopotamia, carrying out both reconnaissance, bombing and air-to-air combat duties. After the end of the way, the squadron continued to serve in Iraq, attacking rebels against the British rule in Iraq and later rebels against the Iraqi government.

History

First World War
In November 1914 the British Royal Flying Corps despatched a flight of aircraft from Britain to Egypt to defend the Suez Canal, as war with the Turkish Empire became increasingly likely. Initial equipment consisted of Farman Longhorn and Shorthorn biplanes, which were soon supplemented by Royal Aircraft Factory B.E.2s and Farman HF.20s sent from India.

On 24 August 1915, the Mesopotamian Half Flight, a unit of the Australian Flying Corps stationed in Mesopotamia (now Iraq) was formally attached to 30 Squadron. For several months the Half-Flight, under Captain Henry Petre, and equipped with a mixture of Farman Shorthorns, Farman Longhorns and Caudron G.3s had been flying operations in support of the Indian Army, against Turkish ground forces, during the Mesopotamian campaign.

On 26 August 1915, a second flight, equipped with Martinsyde Scouts, arrived at Basrah to join the 30 Squadron forces operating in Mesopotamia. The Martinsydes suffered from poor engine reliability in the heat and dusty conditions encountered. Despite this, a forward deployed detachment of the squadron supported the army's advance along the Tigris river, with reconnaissance by the squadron's aircraft helping the British and Indian forces to win the Battle of Es Sinn and capture Kut al-Imara in September 1915. In October 1915, the rest of the squadron moved to Mesopotamia, being relieved in Egypt by 14 Squadron. On 7 November, the squadron was reorganised with headquarters and B Flight at Basra and A Flight deployed forward at Azizaya.

The squadron continued to support the British forces as they advanced towards Bagdhad, until the advance was stopped by the Battle of Ctesiphon on 22–25 November 1915. An air reconnaissance mission on the eve of the battle carried out by Major H. L Reilly of the squadron spotted that the Turkish positions in front of Ctesiphon had been heavily reinforced, but his aircraft was shot down by ground-fire and Reilly captured. It has been suggested in the Official Histories of the Air War and the Campaign in Mesopotamia, that if Reilly had successfully returned with his intelligence to the British lines, Major General Townshend, commander of the British force, would have aborted the attack. After Ctesiphon, the British column retreated to Kut al-Imara, pursued by the Turkish Army, and Kut was besieged from 7 December 1915. Those aircraft that could evacuate left Kut earlier that day, but most of the personnel of the forward deployed A and B flights of the squadron, along with three unserviceable aircraft, were trapped in the besieged town.

While reduced in serviceable strength to only a single B.E.2, the Squadron provided reconnaissance support to the force sent to relieve the troops trapped at Kut. The squadron was reinforced by four more B.E.2s in February 1916. The relief column failed to break through to Kut, and in April 1916, the squadron, with eight B.E.2s, together with seven RNAS aircraft, carried out one of the earliest air supply mission when it air-dropped food and other supplies to the besieged garrison. While  of food was dropped between 15 and 29 April, this was insufficient to feed the trapped troops and the civilian population of the town, and Major General Townshend surrendered on 29 April. The squadron built up its strength over the summer, and by August had 13 B.E.2s, which were supplemented by six Martinsyde Elephant scouts in September 1916. The squadron supported the resumed British offensive that started in December 1916, which resulted in the British capture of Baghdad on 11 March 1917, with the squadron moving to Baghdad airfield later that day. In April 1917, the Ottoman air defences were strengthened by the arrival of Halberstadt fighters from Germany, which outclassed 30 Squadrons B.E.2s. In response, two Bristol Scout fighters joined the squadron, with the promise that more capable Spad VIIs would follow.

In August that year, 63 Squadron arrived in Mesopotamia, so that 30 Squadron was no longer the sole source of air support for the British forces. In September the promised Spads arrived to replace 30 Squadron's Bristol Scouts, while from October Royal Aircraft Factory R.E.8s arrived to supersede the obsolete BE.2s, which were phased out by February 1918. In December 1917–January 1918, the squadron received two Airco DH.4 bombers, but both had been lost by the end of January 1918.

1920s & 1930s

In 1919 the squadron was sent to Iran as part of the Norperforce. In April 1919, the squadron was reduced to a cadre at Baghdad, but not disbanded, and in February 1920, it returned to full strength at Baghdad as an Army co-operation squadron equipped with RE.8s, with these gradually being replaced by Airco DH.9A light bombers, with re-equipment being complete by early 1921. From June 1920, the squadron, along with the rest of the RAF's strength in Iraq, was deployed against an Iraqi revolt against British rule. In May–June 1921, 30 and 47 Squadron's DH.9As supported the establishing of a permanent Cairo–Baghdad land route, providing an air escort for vehicle convoys creating a visible track across the desert, while from 21 June that year the two squadrons began air-mail runs along the Cairo-Baghdad route.

In early 1924, aircraft from the squadron were deployed to Kirkuk  for operations against a revolt led by the Kurdish leader Sheikh Mahmud Barzanji. The city of Sulaymaniyah, the base of Mahmud's operations was bombed, and Mahmud withdrew into the mountains. The squadron again saw action in the summers of 1925 and 1926 as Mahmud's rebellion reignited, attacking rebel-held villages. In late February 1938, a flight of 30 Squadron aircraft joined 'Akforce', a force of aircraft set up to stop Ikhwan nomadic raiders from Saudi Arabia attacking Iraq and Kuwait, these operations continuing until June.

In 1929 the squadron replaced its DH.9As with Westland Wapitis. In September 1930, Mahmud again raised a rebellion against the British and Iraqis, and 30 Squadron supported Iraqi Army operations against the rebels. The campaign against Mahmud continued until May 1931, when Mahmud surrendered. Wapitis of 30 Squadron flew 2204 hours between October 1930 and May 1931 in operations against Mahmud. In March 1932, the Iraqi Army launched an offensive against a revolt by the supporters of Ahmed Barzani in Southern Kurdistan. 30 Squadron initially provided reconnaissance support to the Iraqi Army columns, but after one column was heavily attacked and forced to retreat, the RAF launched a series of air attacks against Barzani's forces until Barzani crossed the border into Turkey. In April–August 1935 the squadron received Hawker Hardys (a tropicalised, general purpose version of the Hawker Hart light bomber), being the first squadron to receive the Hardy. In 1936 the squadron moved to the RAFs new base in Iraq, RAF Habbaniya. It re-equipped with modern Blenheim I monoplane bombers in 1938.

Second World War

In August 1939, as war loomed, the squadron moved  back to RAF Ismailia in Egypt and carried out escort missions in the Western Desert and provided fighter defence of Alexandria. In November 1940, it was sent to Greece to operate its Blenheims in both the bomber and fighter roles, with the first of its Blenheims arriving at Eleusis airfield near Athens on 3 November, with forward deployments of the bombers to an airfield at Paramythia, while the squadron's fighter Blenheims remained back at Eleusis to protect Athens. In March 1941 the squadron was redesignated a fighter unit. On 5 April, five Blenheims were detached to Crete, and tasked with maritime reconnaissance, convoy escort and night fighting. More of the squadron's Blenheims were sent to Maleme on Crete on 17 April. By the middle of May German air attacks on Crete had made the squadron's operations from the island untenable, and on 15 May the squadrons remaining three airworthy Blenheims were evacuated to Egypt. Despite this, 229 officers and men from 30 and 33 Squadrons remained at Maleme when the Germans launched an attack on the airfield by airborne troops on 20 May. Many of these Airmen, despite being poorly armed took part in the defence of Maleme before the survivors attempted to evacuate via Sfakia. Losses were heavy. After the losses during the fall of Greece and the Battle of Crete the squadron was rebuilt as a fighter unit equipped with Hawker Hurricanes and employed on night defence of Alexandria and shipping protection patrols before moving on to operations in the Western Desert.

When the situation in the Far East worsened the squadron was ordered to reinforce allied forces in Java, but by the time the squadron left Egypt, Java, had already fallen, and the squadron was ferried by the aircraft carrier  to Ceylon arriving on 6 March 1942, just in time to assist in resisting the Japanese carrier strike against the island. This raid took place on 5 April 1942 with 21 aircraft being launched from its base at RAF Ratmalana whilst under heavy fire from Japanese aircraft. Seven of the squadron's Hurricanes were lost, with five of its pilots being killed or dying later of wounds received during the battle. It claimed 14 Japanese aircraft shot down, together with six probably destroyed and five damaged, out of a total claim for the whole of the island's defences of 24 shot down, 7 probables and 9 damaged. In fact, the Japanese lost seven aircraft, with a further 15 damaged.

On 28 January 1944, the squadron left Ceylon for the Burma front, flying escort missions for Dakota and C-46 transports over the Kaladan valley. In March, it added night ground-attack sorties against river craft to its escort duties, and moved to Comilla on 10 April 1944. On 25 May 1944, the squadron was pulled out of the front line back to Yelahanka near Bangalore for re-equipment with American Republic P-47 Thunderbolts. It returned to action in October, carrying out bomber and transport escort, and ground attack with guns, bombs and napalm. It operated in support of 15 Corps until the end of March. Operating from Akyab, the squadron supported Operation Dracula, the Anglo-Indian amphibious landings at Rangoon on 1 May. Following the capture of Rangoon, with a lull of operations, the squadron was pulled out of the front line to prepare for Operation Zipper, the planned British invasion of Malaya, but the Japanese surrender on 15 August meant that the squadron was not needed to support the landings.

Post-War

After the Japanese surrender the squadron remained in India and its Thunderbolts were replaced by Hawker Tempest F Mk 2s in March 1946. No. 30 Squadron lost its aircraft on 1 December 1946, before being disbanded on 1 April 1947 at Agra.

On 24 November 1947 the squadron was reformed at RAF Oakington, Cambridgeshire in the transport role, operating as a unit within the Royal Air Force Transport Command. It flew the Dakota on many humanitarian supply flights during the Berlin Airlift. Re-equipment with the Vickers Valetta came in December 1950. The heavier four-engine Blackburn Beverley was flown between April 1957 and September 1967. From November 1959 30 Squadron operated out of RAF Eastleigh in Kenya before moving on to RAF Muharraq in October 1964.

Hercules and Atlas (1968 – present)
The Squadron temporarily disbanded in September 1967 but quickly reformed at RAF Fairford in June 1968 equipped with turbine-propeller powered Lockheed Hercules transports, maintaining the units transport role. the squadron moved to RAF Lyneham in September 1971.

During 2008 'A' flight was based at RAF Al Udeid with the Hercules C.4.

The squadron flew its last Hercules flight on 8 December 2016. It then took on an administrative role and later reformed on 28 September 2021 to become the second frontline squadron operating the Airbus A400M Atlas.

Aircraft operated

Farman Longhorn 1915
Farman Shorthorn 1915–1916
Voisin LAS 1915–1916
Henry Farman F27 1915
Caudron G.3 1915
Royal Aircraft Factory B.E.2 1915–1917
Royal Aircraft Factory R.E.8 1917–19
Airco D.H.9 1921–1929
Westland Wapiti 1929–1935
Hawker Hardy 1935–1938
Bristol Blenheim 1938–1941
Hawker Hurricane 1941–1944
Republic P-47 Thunderbolt 1944–1946
Hawker Tempest F2 1946
Douglas Dakota 1947–1950
Vickers Valetta 1950–1957
Blackburn Beverley 1957–1967
Lockheed C-130 Hercules 1968–2016
Airbus A400M Atlas 2021 – present

Memorials

There is a Royal Air Force (RAF) memorial in Crete to the airmen of 30 and 33 Squadrons who died during the Battle of Crete. The memorial is located  behind the roadside hedge between Maleme and Tavronitis overlooking the  Iron Bridge across the Tavronitis River and the end of Maleme Airport runway.

Another memorial was unveiled at the National Memorial Arboretum in Staffordshire in September 2008.

Battle honours
From Ashworth except where stated. Honours marked with an asterisk may be emblazoned on the Squadron Standard.

Egypt (1915)*
Mesopotamia (1915–1918)*
Iraq (1919–1920)
North West Persia (1920)
Kurdistan (1922–1924)
Iraq (1923–1925)
Iraq (1928–1929)
Kurdistan (1930–1931) 
Northern Kurdistan (1932)
Egypt and Libya (1940–1942)*
Greece (1940–1941)* 
Mediterranean (1940–1941)*
Ceylon (April 1942)*
Arakan (1944)*
Burma (1944–1945)*
South Atlantic (1982)
Gulf (1991)
Afghanistan (2001–2014)
Iraq (2003–2011)
Libya (2011)

References

Notes

Citations

Bibliography

 
 

 

 
 

 
 
 
 
 
 

 
 

 Tennant, Lieutenant Colonel J. E. In the Clouds above Baghdad. London: Cecil Palmer, 1920.

Further reading

External links

30 Squadron Webpage
30 Squadron Webpage 2

Military units and formations established in 1915
030 Squadron
Military of British Ceylon
030 Squadron
1915 establishments in the United Kingdom
Military units and formations in Mandatory Palestine in World War II